Anil Radhakrishnan Menon is an Indian film director working in Malayalam film.

Career
Anil Radhakrishnan Menon directed television commercials before venturing into feature films.
 
His first film North 24 Kaatham starring Fahadh Faasil and Nedumudi Venu(2013) won the National Film Award for Best Feature Film in Malayalam and Kerala State Film Award for Second Best Film.

His second film Sapthamashree Thaskaraha (2014) also received positive reviews from critics, and became a box office hit.

Filmography

Personal life
Anil's father is Radhakrishnan Palat and mother is Jayasree.  He is married to Sarada and has a son named Rajat Anil.

References

Malayalam film directors
Kerala State Film Award winners
Living people
Film directors from Kerala
People from Ottapalam
Year of birth missing (living people)